Edo Šen (born Edo Schön; 1877–1949) was a Croatian Jewish architect notable for creating the foundation of the modern Croatian architecture.

Early life 
Šen was born in Zagreb on 10 March 1877. After high school graduation in 1894, he went to Vienna, Austria where he studied at the Vienna University of Technology. Šen graduated in 1900. After graduation, he worked in the studio of Slovenian architect Max Fabiani.

Career
In 1901 Šen returned to Zagreb and started to work as a servant in the City council Civil engineering office. There he led technical tasks related to building and construction control. In 1905 Šen co-founded the Croatian architects club (Klub hrvatskih arhitekta). From 1908 to 1919 he was a professor at the Technical School in Zagreb. He was one of the founders, in 1919, of the Faculty of Architecture, University of Zagreb and one of its first professors. Later he was elected rector of the Faculty of Architecture, University of Zagreb.

Šen's work is strongly influenced by historical eclecticism. His early eclecticism is characterized by the idiosyncratic elements on the main facade of the Croatia osiguranje palace in Tomáš Garrigue Masaryk street, Zagreb. After 1918 his work shows the influence of the Modern architecture, but that influence was not applied dogmatically. Representative public buildings, such as the Institute of Forestry (1926) in Božidar Adžija street, Zagreb, is massed in large cubic forms expressing restrained monumentality. Other Sen's realization of that era are apartment buildings "Mervar" (former "Society humanity home") in Petrinjska street and residential building "Bezuk" in Boškovićeva street, all in Zagreb. During his career he worked with the Croatian architect Juraj Denzler. In 1930 Šen started to work with another Croatian architect, Milovan Kovačević. Kovačević was also his assistant at the Faculty of Architecture, University of Zagreb. Šen died in Zagreb on 16 June 1949.

Gallery

References

Bibliography

1877 births
1948 deaths
Architects from Zagreb
Croatian Jews
Austro-Hungarian Jews
Croatian Austro-Hungarians
TU Wien alumni
Jewish architects
Academic staff of the University of Zagreb